The Perry County School District is a public school district based in New Augusta, Mississippi (USA).

In addition to New Augusta, the district also serves the town of Beaumont as well as most rural areas in northeastern Perry County.

Schools
Perry Central High School (Grades 9-12)
Beaumont Elementary School (Grades K-8)
New Augusta Elementary School (Grades K-8)
Runnelstown Elementary School (Grades K-8)

Demographics

2006-07 school year
There were a total of 1,400 students enrolled in the Perry County School District during the 2006–2007 school year. The gender makeup of the district was 48% female and 52% male. The racial makeup of the district was 33.50% African American, 65.86% White, 0.43% Hispanic, and 0.21% Native American. 64.4% of the district's students were eligible to receive free lunch.

Previous school years

Accountability statistics

See also
List of school districts in Mississippi

References

External links
 

Education in Perry County, Mississippi
School districts in Mississippi